Usqullu (Quechua for Andean mountain cat, hispanicized spelling Oscollo) is a mountain in the Andes of Peru, about  high. It is situated in the Arequipa Region, Castilla Province, Andagua District. Usqullu lies northwest of the peak of Wakapallqa (Huagapalca) and northeast of Puma Ranra and Usqullu Lake.

References 

Mountains of Peru
Mountains of Arequipa Region